Rüstem Pasha Caravanserai  is a caravanserai located in Ereğli, Konya, Turkey, commissioned by Ottoman statesman and grand vizier Rüstem Pasha and built by court architect Mimar Sinan in 1552.

References

Buildings and structures completed in 1552
Commercial buildings completed in the 16th century
Buildings and structures in Konya Province
Buildings and structures of the Ottoman Empire
Caravanserais in Turkey
Ottoman caravanserais
1552 establishments in the Ottoman Empire
Mimar Sinan buildings